Fire It Up is the seventh studio album by Canadian country music artist Johnny Reid. It was released on March 12, 2012 by EMI Records. The album features duets with Serena Ryder and Carolyn Dawn Johnson.

Fire It Up won Country Album of the Year at the 2013 Juno Awards.

Track listing

Personnel
Kevin Killen - Mixer
ALIAS Chamber Ensemble - strings
Chopper Anderson - electric bass
Tom Bukovac - acoustic guitar, electric guitar
Chad Cromwell - drums, percussion
Chuck Fields - drums
Jon-Paul Frappiér - trumpet
Vicki Hampton - background vocals
Thom Hardwell - acoustic guitar
Jon Jackson - tenor saxophone
Carolyn Dawn Johnson - duet vocals on "Baby I Know It"
Johnny Reid - lead vocals
Michael Rhodes - bass guitar
Mike Rojas - accordion, Hammond B-3 organ, keyboards, grand piano, Wurlitzer
Serena Ryder - duet vocals on "Walking on Water"
Mark Selby - bouzouki, acoustic guitar, harmonica
Crystal Taliafero - background vocals
Toronto Police Pipe Band - bagpipes
Oscar Utterström - trombone
Chris West - baritone saxophone, tenor saxophone
Jonathan Yudkin - cello, fiddle, mandolin

Chart performance

Album

Singles

Year-end charts

Certifications

References

2012 albums
Johnny Reid albums
EMI Records albums
Canadian Country Music Association Top Selling Canadian Album albums
Juno Award for Country Album of the Year albums